Bobby Fischer Against the World is a documentary feature film that explores the life of chess Grandmaster and  11th World Champion Bobby Fischer. It incorporates interviews with chess players Anthony Saidy, Larry Evans, Sam Sloan, Susan Polgar, Garry Kasparov, Asa Hoffmann, Friðrik Ólafsson, Lothar Schmid and others. It includes rare archive footage from the World Chess Championship 1972.

Director Liz Garbus began her work on the film after Fischer's death in 2008 at the age of 64.  She said of Fischer:  "It's hard to imagine that in 1972, all eyes were on a chess match, but it does, in fact, seem to be the case. Bobby Fischer was this self-taught Brooklyn boy who took the New York chess scene and then the national chess scene by storm. And the Russians had been dominating the sport for decades. ... So for an American to have a real chance at beating that [Soviet] machine, this was big stuff. ... The symbolism of the match was enormous."

The documentary has an 88% rating and an average rating of 7.1/10 on Rotten Tomatoes.

The film is dedicated to editor Karen Schmeer, who was killed in a hit-and-run accident while they were already a few months into the editing process.

See also
List of books and documentaries by or about Bobby Fischer

References

External links
 

2011 documentary films
American sports documentary films
Works about Bobby Fischer
Documentary films about sportspeople
Films about chess
HBO documentary films
American independent films
Films directed by Liz Garbus
2011 in chess
2011 independent films
2011 films
2010s English-language films
2010s American films